María Gentil Arcos (11 April 1905 – 18 July 1965) was a Spanish-Mexican actress of the Golden Age of Mexican cinema as a character actress in supporting roles.

She was the sister of Conchita Gentil Arcos, also an actress in the Golden Age of Mexican cinema; María began her work as an actress in 1938, while Conchita had already started her career in 1932. Among her characters stand out the mute and paralyzed mother of Pepe el Toro (Pedro Infante) who dies from the beating given by Miguel Inclán's character in Nosotros los Pobres (1948), and as the determined mother of Kid Terranova (David Silva) in Champion Without a Crown (1946).

The writer Carlos Monsiváis referred to her (alongside her sister María) as one of the "complementary faces" of Mexican cinema, writing, "After all, they are not many, but their years on the screen make them a tribe..."

Selected filmography

References

Bibliography

External links

1905 births
1965 deaths
Mexican film actresses
Spanish film actresses
20th-century Mexican actresses
20th-century Spanish actresses
People from Valencia
Spanish emigrants to Mexico